This is a list of Wardens of Merton College, Oxford.

Peter of Abingdon, 1264–86
Richard Werplysdon, 1286–95
John de la More, 1295–99
John de Wantynge, 1299–1328
Robert Trenge, 1328–51
William Durant, 1351–75
John Bloxham, 1375–87
John Wendover, 1387–98
Edmund Bekyngham, 1398–1416
Thomas Rodebourne, 1416–17
Robert Gilbert, 1417–21
Henry Abyndon, 1421–37
Elias Holcot, 1437–55
Henry Sever, 1455–71
John Gigur, 1471–82
Richard Fitzjames, 1482–1507
Thomas Harper, 1507–08
Richard Rawlins, 1508–21
Roland Philips, 1521–25
John Chambers, 1525–44
Henry Tindall, 1544–45
Thomas Reynolds, 1545–59
James Gervase, 1559–62
John Man, 1562–69
Thomas Bickley, 1569–85
Henry Savile, 1585–1621
Nathaniel Brent, 1621–45
William Harvey, 1645–46
Nathaniel Brent, 1646–51
Jonathan Goddard, 1651–60
Edward Reynolds, 1660–61
Thomas Clayton, 1661–93
Richard Lydall, 1693–1704
Edmund Martin, 1704–09
John Holland, 1709–34
Robert Wyntle, 1734–50
John Robinson, 1750–59
Henry Barton, 1759–90
Scrope Berdmore, 1790–1810
Peter Vaughan, 1810–26
Robert Bullock Marsham, 1826–80
George Charles Brodrick, 1881–1903
Thomas Bowman, 1904–36
John Charles Miles, 1936–47
Geoffrey Reginald Gilchrist Mure, 1947–63
Robin Harrison, 1963–69
Sir Rex Richards, 1969–84
John M. Roberts, 1984–94
Dame Jessica Rawson, 1994–2010
Sir Martin J. Taylor, 2010–2018
Steven Gunn (acting), 2018–2019
Irene Tracey, 2019–22

See also
 Merton College, Oxford
 List of alumni of Merton College, Oxford

References

Merton College, Oxford
Merton College, Wardens
Merton College